Curt Ackermann (8 April 1905 – 1988) was a German stage and film actor. He also worked regularly as a voice actor, dubbing foreign films for release in Germany.

Selected filmography
 The Mysterious Mister X (1936)
 Signal in the Night (1937)
 Yvette (1938)
 Melody of a Great City (1943)
 A Man with Principles? (1943)
 Back Then (1943)
 The Enchanted Day (1944)
 Tell the Truth (1946)
 The Chaplain of San Lorenzo (1953)
 The Captain and His Hero (1955)
 Tattoo (1967)

References

Bibliography 
 Waldman, Harry. Nazi Films in America, 1933-1942. McFarland, 2008.

External links 
 

1905 births
1933 deaths
German male film actors
German male stage actors
German male voice actors
20th-century German male actors
Actors from Dortmund